"How Ya Gonna Keep 'em Down on the Farm (After They've Seen Paree?)" is a World War I song that rose to popularity after the war had ended. The lyrics highlight concern that soldiers would not want to return to their family farms after experiencing the European city life and culture of Paris during World War I.

Performances and recordings
The song was first introduced to vaudeville by Sophie Tucker.

Eddie Cantor also added it to his stage set.

An early jazz band, Jim Europe's 369th Infantry Band frequently performed this song in 1919 after arriving back in New York. They recorded a version for Pathé Records and it became a hit for that year.

Also, Nora Bayes and Billy Murray recorded it for Columbia that same year. Bayes' version reached number two on the US song charts in March 1919. Victor released its recording, featuring the singer Arthur Fields, on February 27, 1919.

Like many World War I songs, it was sung by soldiers in World War II.

Andrew Bird included a more melancholy cover version in his 2007 EP Soldier On.

Composition
The song features music by Walter Donaldson and words by Joe Young and Sam M. Lewis. It was published in 1919 by Waterson, Berlin & Snyder Co in New York.  The team of Donaldson, Young and Lewis, wrote another topical song commenting on soldiers returning from the war that was released by Victor the day before "How Ya Gonna Keep Em Down on the Farm." "Don’t Cry Frenchy, Don’t Cry" was released by Victor on February 26, 1919.  It featured the singers Charles Hart and Elliott Shaw.

The song is in the public domain.

Pop culture

The phrase 'How you gonna keep them down on the farm once...' has entered the vernacular to indicate a person becoming enamored by a big city or more glamorous life.

References

Bibliography
 Hagedorn, Ann. Savage Peace: Hope and Fear in America, 1919. New York: Simon & Schuster, 2007. 
 Holsinger, M. Paul, "How Ya Gonna Keep 'Em Down on the Farm?" (Song) in War and American Popular Culture: A Historical Encyclopedia. Edited by M Paul Holsinger, Westport, CT: Greenwood Press, 1999. 
 True, William, and Deryck Tufts True. The Cow Spoke French: The Story of Sgt. William True, American Paratrooper in World War II. Bennington, Vt: Merriam Press, 2002.

External links
  Listen to an MP3 of the song and see the sheet music at the Illinois Digital Archive
 How 'ya gonna keep 'em down on the farm : (after they've seen Paree?) Sheet Music at the Library of Congress
 Discography of American Historical Recordings

1919 songs
Songs about Paris
Songs of World War I
Nora Bayes songs
Billy Murray (singer) songs
Songs with music by Walter Donaldson
Songs with lyrics by Joe Young (lyricist)
Songs with lyrics by Sam M. Lewis
Sophie Tucker songs
Eddie Cantor songs